The Parks is a cricket ground situated off Fox Grove, Godmanchester, Huntingdonshire. The ground is bordered to the north and south by residential housing and to the east by the A14 road.

History
Established between 1959 and 1972, the ground plays host to the home matches of Godmanchester Town Cricket Club. Huntingdonshire played two List A matches at the ground in the early 2000s, against the Yorkshire Cricket Board in the 2000 NatWest Trophy and the Gloucestershire Cricket Board in the 2002 Cheltenham & Gloucester Trophy, with both matches ending in five wicket defeats for Huntingdonshire. The county also played a single MCCA Knockout Trophy match at The Parks in 2001 against the Essex Cricket Board. Huntingdonshire soon after lost List A status and were excluded from the MCCA Knockout Trophy, but have continued to play in minor fixtures at the ground.

Records

List A
 Highest team total: 207/5 (45 overs) by Yorkshire Cricket Board v Huntingdonshire, 2000
 Lowest team total: 180/8 (50 overs) by Huntingdonshire v Gloucestershire Cricket Board, 2001
 Highest individual innings: 75 by Neil Stovold, as above
 Best bowling in an innings: 3/36 by James Rendell, as above

See also
List of cricket grounds in England and Wales

Notes

References

External links
The Parks, Godmanchester at ESPNcricinfo
The Parks, Godmanchester at CricketArchive

Huntingdonshire County Cricket Club
Cricket grounds in Cambridgeshire
Buildings and structures in Huntingdonshire
Sport in Huntingdonshire
Sports venues completed in 1972
Godmanchester